Dashami is the Sanskrit word for "tenth", and is the tenth day in the lunar fortnight (Paksha) of the Hindu calendar. Each month has two Dashami days, being the tenth day of the "bright" (Shukla) and of the "dark" (Krishna) fortnights respectively. Dashami occurs on the tenth and the twenty-fifth day of each month.

Occasions
The Hindu observance of Vijayadashami, celebrated during the festival of Navarati, falls on a dashami.

References

 

Hindu calendar
10